Herbert Bellamy (7 April 1896 – 16 November 1978) was an English professional footballer who played as a wing half in the Football League for Watford, Swansea Town and Brentford. He later managed Wellingborough and in the Netherlands and Finland.

Personal life 
Herbert was born in Kettering, the son of Edward Bellamy and Allen Barnes. He was married to Daisy York and had two sons, Herbert and Robert. Bellamy served in the British Army during the First World War.

Career statistics

Honours 
Swansea Town

 Football League Third Division South: 1924–25

References

1896 births
1978 deaths
English footballers
English Football League players
Watford F.C. players
Swansea City A.F.C. players
Brentford F.C. players
Sportspeople from Kettering
Wellingborough Town F.C. players
Kidderminster Harriers F.C. players
Kettering Town F.C. players
English expatriate sportspeople in Finland
Wellingborough Town F.C. managers
English football managers
Association football wing halves
Expatriate football managers in Sweden
English expatriate football managers
HVV Den Haag managers
DHC Delft managers
Blauw-Wit Amsterdam managers
Expatriate football managers in the Netherlands
Expatriate football managers in Finland
British Army personnel of World War I